Paco Chan Hoi Pak (born 29 January 1999) is a Hong Kong professional footballer who plays as a midfielder for Hong Kong Premier League club Southern.

References

External links
HKFA

1999 births
Living people
Hong Kong footballers
Association football midfielders
Southern District FC players
Hong Kong Premier League players